Sesswick Halt railway station was a station in Sesswick, Wrexham, Wales. The station was opened on 1 October 1913 and closed on 10 September 1962.

References

Further reading

Disused railway stations in Wrexham County Borough
Railway stations in Great Britain opened in 1913
Railway stations in Great Britain closed in 1940
Railway stations in Great Britain opened in 1946
Railway stations in Great Britain closed in 1962
Former Cambrian Railway stations